"New Car" is the eighth episode of the second season of the American television drama series The Americans, and the 21st overall episode of the series. It originally aired on FX in the United States on April 16, 2014.

Plot
Philip and Henry go to a car dealership to look at new cars, and they buy a new Camaro Z-28. Elizabeth is not pleased with the purchase but says she wants Philip to be happy. Philip stands firm and presses Elizabeth about her enjoyment of American life, but she responds that she is here to do a job and life in America is easier, but not better.

Martha implies that she no longer wants to spy on her coworkers. Philip plans to play a doctored recording of her coworkers making fun of her looks. But his surprise appearance at her apartment is enough to change her mind without using the recording.

Lucia ambushes Larrick at his house with a tranquilizer gun, but her plan backfires when Larrick overpowers her and shoots her with her own tranquilizer. He calls Elizabeth over, revealing a tied-up Lucia. They negotiate Lucia's life for Larrick's release from the KGB's control. However, when Larrick unties Lucia, she attacks him with a corkscrew but is stopped by Larrick. As Lucia is slowly being strangled to death, Elizabeth points her gun at Larrick, who reminds her about the mission. Forced to choose between saving Lucia or saving the mission, she chooses the mission and lets Lucia die. She later expresses frustration to Philip that Lucia did not understand her role.

Philip meets with their handler Kate. She instructs him to steal information on America’s stealth program. She also informs him that the propeller plan he had stolen earlier is faulty, causing a Soviet submarine to sink and all 160 men aboard to die. Philip and Elizabeth are distraught to learn the news.

Henry is caught breaking in by the neighbors when he falls asleep on the sofa after playing a video game. The neighbors bring him back to Philip and Elizabeth without calling the police. When Philip and Elizabeth later talk to Henry, he breaks down admitting to his mistake and saying that he is a good person who 'knows the difference between right and wrong'.

Stan gives Oleg the FBI surveillance log on him and fails to get Oleg to guarantee Nina’s safety. Nina later confronts Stan about Oleg wanting more, realizing that she has successfully turned Stan when he promises to keep her safe no matter what. Stan is frustrated when the FBI and DoJ refuse to grant him access to Anton’s research. He later meets with a DoD official trying to gain clearance.

Arkady is concerned about his nephew in the navy due to the submarine sinking and is upset that the KGB has failed the country. Oleg surmises that the navy is also at fault for placing the propeller on a larger submarine and not testing it adequately.

Philip and Elizabeth kidnap a driver who services the septic system of Martial Eagle base and questions him about his routine. The man is hesitant and extremely fearful. Though Elizabeth is direct and impatient, Philip eventually coaxes the man into answering, telling him everything will be okay. When Elizabeth starts to pull out a gun to kill the man to prevent being traced, Philip stops her, stating they can tie him up instead.

Production
The episode was written by Peter Ackerman and directed by John Dahl.

Reception
The episode was watched by 1.39 million viewers, as per Nielsen ratings. The reviews for the episode were positive. The A.V. Club rated gave the episode an A. Alan Sepinwall from Hitfix reviewed the episode positively and summarized the episode where "prevailing emotions are despair and frustration that other people don't believe as deeply as you in the things that you think matter, and that even when they do, belief alone can't prevent great tragedy." IGN rated the episode 9/10 and called it "Amazing".

References

External links
 "New Car" at FX
 

The Americans (season 2) episodes
2014 American television episodes
Television episodes directed by John Dahl